Following is an incomplete list of past and present Members of Parliament (MPs) of the United Kingdom whose surnames begin with S.  The dates in parentheses are the periods for which they were MPs.

Michael Thomas Sadler
Timothy Sainsbury
Shapurji Saklatvala
Alex Salmond
Titus Salt
Alfred Salter
Martin Salter (1997–2010)
David Samuel, 3rd Viscount Samuel
Herbert Samuel, 1st Viscount Samuel
Adrian Sanders
Bobby Sands
Duncan Sandys
Mohammad Sarwar
Philip Sassoon
Malcolm Savidge
Phil Sawford
Jonathan Sayeed
C. P. Scott
Lee Scott
Edwin Scrymgeour
Alison Seabeck (2005–present)
Brian Sedgemore
Charles Sedley
Charles Seely
Sir Charles Seely, 2nd Baronet
Sir Charles Seely, 1st Baronet
Andrew Selous
David Shackleton (1902–1910)
Edward Shackleton, Baron Shackleton
Grant Shapps
Richard Sharples
Jonathan Shaw
Hartley Shawcross
Barry Sheerman
Robert Sheldon
Gillian Shephard
Richard Shepherd
William Shepherd
James Sheridan
Michael Shersby
Baron Sherwood
Hugh Seely, 1st Baron Sherwood
Manny Shinwell
Debra Shipley
Peter Shore
Clare Short (1983–2010)
Edward Short, Baron Glenamara
Edward Shortt
Lewis Silkin, 1st Baron Silkin
Samuel Silkin, Baron Silkin of Dulwich
Jim Sillars
Sydney Silverman
Mark Simmonds
John Simon
Siôn Simon
Alan Simpson
David Simpson
Keith Simpson
Archibald Sinclair, 1st Viscount Thurso
John Sinclair, 3rd Viscount Thurso
Marsha Singh
Trevor Skeet
Dennis Skinner
Andy Slaughter
William Small
Andrew Smith
Angela Smith of Basildon
Angela Smith (of South Yorkshire)
Cyril Smith
F. E. Smith, 1st Earl of Birkenhead
Geraldine Smith
Jacqui Smith
John Smith
John Smith
Llew Smith
Sir Robert Smith, 3rd Baronet
Tim Smith
Sir John Smyth, 1st Baronet
Martin Smyth
Peter Snape, Baron Snape
Anne Snelgrove
Harry Snell, 1st Baron Snell
Philip Snowden, 1st Viscount Snowden
Christopher Soames, Baron Soames
Nicholas Soames
Clive Soley
Donald Bradley Somervell, Baron Somervell
Frank Soskice
Anna Soubry
Peter Soulsby
Helen Southworth
Keith Speed
John Spellar
Caroline Spelman
Michael Spicer
Bob Spink
Richard Spring
Rachel Squire
Robin Squire
Nick St Aubyn
Henry St John
Norman St John-Stevas, Baron St John of Fawsley
Edward Stanley, Lord Stanley
John Stanley
Oliver Stanley
Phyllis Starkey
David Steel
Tom Steele
Anthony Steen
Gerry Steinberg
Nicol Stephen
George Stevenson
David Stewart
Donald Stewart
Ian Stewart
Michael Stewart
Sir William Stirling-Maxwell, 9th Baronet
Howard Stoate
Richard Stokes
John Stonehouse
Roger Stott
Gavin Strang
Innes Harold Stranger
George Smythe, 7th Viscount Strangford
Jack Straw
Graham Stringer
Richard Strode
Gisela Stuart
Graham Stuart
James Stuart, 1st Viscount Stuart of Findhorn
Charles Beilby Stuart-Wortley, 1st Baron Stuart of Wortley
Andrew Stunell
Thomas Stuttaford
David Sumberg
Joseph Sunlight
Gerry Sutcliffe
Desmond Swayne
John Swinburne, 7th Baronet
John Swinney
Jo Swinson
Hugo Swire
Robert Syms

 S